Kepler's Dream is a 2016 British-American mystery drama film directed by Amy Glazer, starring Isabella Blake-Thomas, Holland Taylor, Kelly Lynch, Sean Patrick Flanery, David Hunt, Kelly Hu, Steven Michael Quezada, Esperanza Fermin and Stafford Douglas. It is an adaptation of Sylvia Brownrigg's novel, Kepler's Dream.

Cast
 Isabella Blake-Thomas as Ella
 Holland Taylor as Violet von Stern
 Kelly Lynch as Amy
 Sean Patrick Flanery as Walt
 David Hunt as Abercrombie
 Kelly Hu as Irene
 Steven Michael Quezada as Miguel
 Esperanza Fermin as Rosie
 Stafford Douglas as Jackson
 Hank Rogerson as Sheriff Barkley
 Mark Sivertsen as DR Brian Lannert
 Leedy Corbin as Abby
 Tailinh Agoyo as Adela
 Carma Harvey as Nurse
 Ryan Jason Cook as Hospital Administrator
 Sedge Thomson as Pilot

Release
The film was released in theatres on 1 December 2017.

Reception
Frank Scheck of The Hollywood Reporter wrote that the "depiction of the slowly developing friendship and mutual respect between Violet and her granddaughter and the revelation of a tragic event from the past that sheds light on the motivations of several characters" is "far more rewarding" than the main plot, and that Blake-Thomas is "appealing and sympathetic" while Taylor "thankfully infuses subtle shadings into a character who in lesser hands could easily have come across as a stereotype."

Tatiana Craine of The Village Voice wrote that with "charming" source material, Glazer "brings a feel-good puzzler for young audiences from page to screen." Joyce Slaton of Common Sense Media rated the film 3 stars out of 5 and wrote that while the film "may be a little pat and predictable", it is "sweet all the same".

Dennis Harvey of Variety wrote that while the film was "adequately produced", it "lacks any real atmosphere or mystery" and the plot mechanics "feel predictable from the get-go". Kimber Nyers of the Los Angeles Times wrote that while the cast is "largely talented", the film "never comes together around them with its lackluster script and muddled perspective."

References

External links
 
 

American mystery drama films
British mystery drama films
2010s mystery drama films